Message personnel is the 14th studio album by Françoise Hardy. It was released in November 1973.

Track listing

Charts 
In November 2013 the album was released in a new 40th-anniversary edition and re-entered the French and Belgian charts.

References 

1973 albums
Françoise Hardy albums
Warner Records albums